The Land Before Time is a media franchise.

The Land Before Time may also refer to:
 The Land Before Time (film), 1988 American-Irish animated adventure drama film
 Two video games called The Land Before Time released for the Game Boy Color in 2001, and the Game Boy Advance in 2002
 The Land Before Time (TV series), an animated TV series that ran from 2007 to 2008

See also

 
 
 The Land That Time Forgot (disambiguation)